Alan Peter Charles Green (born 19 April 1951) is an English former professional footballer who played in the Football League for Mansfield Town.

References

1951 births
Living people
English footballers
Association football forwards
English Football League players
AFC Bournemouth players
Mansfield Town F.C. players
Salisbury City F.C. players
Andover F.C. players
Basingstoke Town F.C. players